The Bacungan River is a stream or a body of running water in the Philippines' province of Palawan, Mimaropa. The river is situated south of Mangrove Inlet. The terrain elevation above sea level is estimated to be 15 meters.

References 

Rivers of the Philippines